Metaraphia is a monotypic snout moth genus. Its one species, Metaraphia postluteella, was described by George Hampson in 1901 and is known from Borneo.

References

Moths described in 1901
Tirathabini
Monotypic moth genera
Moths of Asia
Pyralidae genera
Taxa named by George Hampson